Hoseyn Qoli may refer to:
 Hoseyn Qoli, Kerman
 Hoseyn Qoli, Khuzestan

See also
 Husayn Quli, a given name